Yoni Dany Louison (born 14 December 1986) is a Mauritian male badminton player.

Achievements

BWF International Challenge/Series
Men's Doubles

 BWF International Challenge tournament
 BWF International Series tournament
 BWF Future Series tournament

References

External links
 

1986 births
Living people
Mauritian male badminton players
Competitors at the 2011 All-Africa Games
African Games bronze medalists for Mauritius
African Games medalists in badminton
21st-century Mauritian people